The Oracle Netsuite Open is an annual squash tournament that takes place in San Francisco in September. One exception is 2020, when it was cancelled amid the COVID-19 pandemic.

Past Results

Men's

Women's

References

External links
 - Oracle Netsuite Open website

 
PSA World Tour
Annual sporting events in the United States
Annual events in California